Football Romeo is a 1938 Our Gang short comedy film directed by George Sidney.  It was the 173rd Our Gang short (174th episode, 85th talking short, 86th talking episode, and fifth MGM produced episode) that was released.

Plot
The gang squares off against "Butch's Assassins" in a crucial football game. Star player Carl Alfalfa balks at participating, leaving it up to Darla to coerce and cajole him into donning his uniform. The climax of the game finds Alfalfa attempting a sixty-yard touchdown, despite the formidable opposition of his lifelong rival Butch.

Cast

The Gang
 Carl Switzer as Alfalfa
 Darla Hood as Darla
 George McFarland as Spanky
 Eugene Lee as Porky
 Billie Thomas as Buckwheat
 Gary Jasgur as Gary
 Leonard Landy as Phooey

Additional cast
 Tommy Bond as Butch
 Sidney Kibrick as The Woim
 Barbara Bedford as Alfalfa's mother

Bit players and extras
Becky Bohanon, Buddy Bowles, Floyd Fisher, Charline Flanders, Morris Grace, Jr., Bruce Grant, Joe Levine, Roger McGee, Norman Salling, Corrine Varian, Robert Winkler

Notes
Football Romeo benefited from the comedy expertise of uncredited script contributor Jack White, who directed many Three Stooges films at Columbia Pictures under the pseudonym "Preston Black".

See also
 Our Gang filmography

References

External links

1938 films
American black-and-white films
Films directed by George Sidney
Metro-Goldwyn-Mayer short films
1938 comedy films
Our Gang films
1938 short films
1930s American films